The Saudades River is a river of Santa Catarina state in southeastern Brazil. It is a tributary of the Chapecó River, part of the Uruguay River basin.

See also
List of rivers of Santa Catarina

References

Rivers of Santa Catarina (state)